The 2022 Liga 4 was the fourth season of fourth-tier football in Georgia under its current title. The season began on 5 April and ended on 20 November.

Team changes
The following teams have changed division since the previous season:

To Liga 4
Relegated from Liga 3

Magaroeli Chiatura • Didube Tbilisi 

Promoted from Regionuli Liga

Locomotive Tbilisi II • Samgurali Tskaltubo II

From Liga 4
Promoted to Liga 3

Dinamo Tbilisi II • Zestafoni • Borjomi • Irao Tbilisi

Relegated to Regionuli Liga

Torpedo Kutaisi II • Tbilisi • Imereti Khoni • Egrisi Senaki

Teams and locations

Sixteen  teams took part in the tournament in 2022. Two of them had previously been members of the first tier: Sulori Vani (1991, 1991-92) and Magaroeli Chiatura (1993-94, 1997-98). Four more spots were occupied by reserve teams of higher league clubs.

League table

Following this season, Locomotive II achieved a back-to-back promotion, while Didube and Magaroeli suffered a double relegation. After the first round Iberia Tbilisi withdrew from the tournament with a 3–0 win awarded to each of their opponents in the second half.

Results

References

External links
Georgian Football Federation

Liga 4 (Georgia) seasons
4
Georgia
Georgia